Ringley Old Bridge is an ancient stone bridge in Kearsley near Bolton, England which crosses the River Irwell, linking Ringley with Stoneclough. It has two large semi-circular arches, and a third smaller arch, for the tow path. It is a Grade II* structure, listed on 19 August 1986.

It was built in 1677, at a cost of £500. It replaced a wooden bridge, swept away by flood in 1673.

See also

Listed buildings in Kearsley

References

Grade II* listed buildings in Greater Manchester
Buildings and structures in the Metropolitan Borough of Bolton
Scheduled monuments in Greater Manchester
Tourist attractions in the Metropolitan Borough of Bolton
History of the Metropolitan Borough of Bolton
Bridges completed in 1677
1677 establishments in England